Mountainscapes is an album by American jazz bassist Barre Phillips recorded in 1976 and released on the ECM label.

Reception
The Allmusic review awarded the album 3 stars.

Track listing
All compositions by Barre Phillips, Dieter Feichtner, John Surman and Stu Martin
 "Mountainscape I" - 5:54   
 "Mountainscape II" - 2:45   
 "Mountainscape III" - 4:21   
 "Mountainscape IV" - 4:25   
 "Mountainscape V" - 4:50   
 "Mountainscape VI" - 4:33   
 "Mountainscape VII" - 3:21   
 "Mountainscape VIII" - 7:12
Recorded at Studio Bauer in Ludwigsburg, West Germany in March 1976

Personnel
Barre Phillips — bass
John Surman — soprano saxophone. baritone saxophone, bass clarinet, synthesizer
Dieter Feichtner — synthesizer
Stu Martin — drums, synthesizer
John Abercrombie — guitar (track 8)

References

ECM Records albums
Barre Phillips albums
1976 albums
Albums produced by Manfred Eicher